Hack is an American crime drama television series created by David Koepp that aired on CBS in the United States from September 27, 2002 to March 13, 2004, having 40 episodes broadcast over two seasons. The series centers on former Philadelphia police officer Mike Olshansky (David Morse), who leaves the force after being accused of corruption and works as a taxi driver.

Premise
Mike Olshansky, a Philadelphia police officer, leaves the force after being accused of corruption. Although the charges were never clearly proven, Olshansky, riddled with guilt, considers it his duty to make up for his past wrongs by helping those the police will not help. While working as a taxi driver, Olshansky saves many lives and people by going above and beyond the call of duty, becoming a kind of heroic vigilante.

He receives "inside" help from within the police force from his ex-partner Marcellus Washington, who often comes close to risking his own career. Meanwhile, he tries to repair his relationships and rebuild his life after losing his marriage, his son's admiration, his professional identity and his reputation.

Cast
Cast listed by number of episodes in which they appeared
 David Morse as Mike Olshansky
 Andre Braugher as Marcellus Washington 
 Matthew Borish as Mikey Olshansky 
 George Dzundza as Father Tom Grzelak (Season 1)
 Donna Murphy as Heather Olshansky (Season 1)
 Matt Czuchry as Jamie Farrel (Season 2)
 Jacqueline Torres as Liz Garza (Season 2)
 JoAnna Rhinehart as Deborah Washington
 Paul Adelstein as Aldo Rossi
 Bebe Neuwirth as Faith O'Connor (Season 1)
 Gregg Edelman as Ryan Ambrose 
 Cindy Katz as Bettina Corwin
 Cameron Ball as Ashton Washington

Production
The series was produced by The Thomas Carter Company, Pariah, Big Ticket Television and CBS Productions. David Morse said of his role as Olshansky;  "I think I can really live with Olshansky. We can go a lot of places. And as an actor, being in this kind of production is pretty unheard of. I didn’t even think it was possible. To actually go home every day and see my kids is a great thing... I like being a dad. I like going to the grocery store and cooking every night." Filming took place on location in Philadelphia.

Hack would go on to become one of the last series to air on Saturdays in the United States for over a decade, as during the series' tenure, networks began to remove first-run scripted programming from the prime-time slot on Saturdays.

Broadcast
The show also aired in the United Kingdom on ITV3, being only one of two original dramas to be shown on the channel's launch night on November 1, 2004. The final four episodes of the first season never aired on ITV3, as the network allowed the broadcast rights to lapse before they were shown; however, both seasons later aired in their entirety on CBS Drama and CBS Action, beginning with the first season on February 10, 2015. Episodes were broadcast weekdays at 10:00pm.

The series also in Australia on Network Ten, France on M6 and Russia on Fox Crime. In the United States, the series re-run on Crime & Investigation, AXS TV, Universal TV and GetTV. On GetTV, episodes aired at 3:00pm weekdays from April 24, 2017. Both series were also available for streaming on Netflix, however have since been removed.

Release
On March 8, 2016, CBS Home Entertainment released Hack: Season 1 on DVD in Region 1 via Amazon.com's CreateSpace program. This is a Manufacture on Demand (MOD) release, available exclusively through Amazon.com.

Episodes

Season 1 (2002–03)

Season 2 (2003–04)

Note

References

External links 

 

2000s American crime drama television series
2002 American television series debuts
2004 American television series endings
CBS original programming
Fictional portrayals of the Philadelphia Police Department
Television series by CBS Studios
Television shows filmed in Pennsylvania
Television shows set in Philadelphia
Vigilante television series
Works about taxis
Works by David Koepp